BNQT ( "banquet") is an indie super-group featuring Fran Healy (Travis), Alex Kapranos (Franz Ferdinand), Eric Pulido (Midlake), Ben Bridwell (Band of Horses) and Jason Lytle (Grandaddy), backed by other members of Midlake: Jesse Chandler, Joey McClellan and McKenzie Smith.

Background
The concept came to Pulido whilst he was touring Midlake’s 2013 album Antiphon. Pulido wanted to gather a number of contrasting yet complementary artists he had befriended or shared the stage with and establish an environment in which they could collaborate. Pulido said "That’s what art is about for me, creating with other people that you love and appreciate." Due to members being spread around the world, recordings were either done through travel to Denton, Texas or remotely over the internet. Pulido said that he envisioned the project as a "poor man's Traveling Wilburys."

Pulido initially approached John Grant, the lead singer from The Czars about the project. Grant proved unavailable for the recording of the band's debut studio album, Volume 1, but has however expressed interest in involvement in the second BNQT album, to be titled Volume 2.

Volume 1 (2015–present)
The BNQT debut album Volume 1 was recorded and self-produced by the band members at Redwood Studios in Denton, Texas and released on 28 April 2017. Each of the five vocalists wrote and sang on two songs each for the album. It received a mainly positive reaction from music critics. On Metacritic, it received an average critic score of 78, based on 14 reviews, indicating "generally favourable reviews". Tim Sendra of Allmusic described it as a "remarkably coherent and listenable album that goes down very smooth, but not without the occasional moment of real emotion or foot-tapping fun". In a five-star review for The Guardian, Jon Dennis praised each member, writing that "All provide great tunes...and they entertain rather than indulge in introspection" and described the band as "much more than the sum of its parts". Record Collector magazine described the album as working "perfectly in being an ensemble creation that taps into a hazy nostalgia vibe"

In a less favourable review for Pitchfork, Philip Cosores criticised the album for being "hapless projects that are more fun for the artists involved than for the listeners".

BNQT's tour to promote the debut album commenced in Dallas on October 23, before visiting the UK, the Netherlands, Ireland and France, where the band played at the Café de la Danse theatre in Paris.

Discography

References

Musical groups established in 2015
Rock music supergroups